East Hollywood is a densely populated neighborhood of 78,000+ residents in the central region of Los Angeles, California. It is notable for being the site of Los Angeles City College, Barnsdall Park, and a hospital district. There are seven public and five private schools, a Los Angeles Public Library branch, and three hospitals. Almost two-thirds of the people living there were born outside the United States, and 90% were renters. In 2000 the neighborhood had high percentages of never-married people and single parents.

History

In the early 20th century, the East Hollywood area was a farming village that also encompassed some of what is now Los Feliz. Parts of the neighborhood were formerly known as "Prospect Park."

In 1910 the towns of Hollywood and East Hollywood approved annexation to the City of Los Angeles in order to tap into the city water supply. In 1914, Children's Hospital was relocated from downtown LA to Vermont Avenue and Sunset Boulevard.

In 1916 steel magnate Andrew Carnegie donated the money to construct the Cahuenga Branch of the Los Angeles Public Library on Santa Monica Boulevard.

In the early 1920s, Barnsdall Park was built. The 1920s were also a time of massive immigration into East Hollywood. Armenian immigrants established the community that is now Little Armenia. The University of California Southern Branch, needing more space, moved west at the end of the 1920s to a ranch called Westwood and became UCLA. The old Southern Branch campus then became Los Angeles Junior College, which was later renamed Los Angeles City College.

In 1930 Cedars of Lebanon Hospital was formed when Kaspare Cohn Hospital moved from East Los Angeles to a new building on Fountain Avenue and was renamed.

US 101, the Hollywood Freeway, was built between 1947 and 1949.

In the summer of 1999 three Metro Red Line subway stations opened, connecting East Hollywood more efficiently to the rest of the city.

Demographics

The 2000 U.S. census counted 73,967 residents in the 2.38-square-mile East Hollywood neighborhood—or 31,095 people per square mile, the third-highest population density in the city. In 2008, the city estimated that the population had increased to 78,192 - or 32,853 people per square mile. In 2000 the median age for residents was 31, about average for city and county neighborhoods; the percentage of residents aged 19 to 34 was among the county's highest.

The neighborhood was "moderately diverse" ethnically within Los Angeles, the statistics being Latino people of any race, 60.4%; Asians, 15.5%; Non-Hispanic Whites, 17.5%;  blacks, 2.4%; and others, 4.1%.  El Salvador (21.2%) and Mexico (20.1%) were the most common places of birth for the 66.5% of the residents who were born abroad—which was a high percentage compared to Los Angeles as a whole.

The median yearly household income in 2008 dollars was $29,927, considered low for the city, and high percentages of households earned $40,000 or less. Renters occupied 91.3% of the housing stock, and house- or apartment-owners held 8.7%. The average household size of three people was average for Los Angeles. The percentages of never-married women (33.3%) and men (42.6%) were among the county's highest. One-fifth of the 3,281 families were headed by single parents, a high rate for Los Angeles.

In 2000 there were 1,509 veterans, or 2.8% of the population, a low rate compared with the rest of the city and county.

Geography

East Hollywood Neighborhood Council
According to The East Hollywood Neighborhood Council, East Hollywood is bounded by Western Avenue on the west, Hollywood Boulevard on the north, Hoover Street on the east, and the Hollywood Freeway on the south.  It contains the following districts: 

 District 1: Thai Town 
 District 2: Hollymont Junction 
 District 3: Hollyset Junction 
 District 4: Little Armenia West 
 District 5: College Village
 District 6: Virgil Village

Mapping L.A.
According to the Mapping L.A. project of the Los Angeles Times, East Hollywood borders Los Feliz to the north and Silver Lake, about 4 miles from Downtown Los Angeles to the east. It also borders Wilshire Center to the south and Hollywood on the west.

According to the Times, East Hollywood includes the smaller neighborhoods of Thai Town, Little Armenia and Melrose Hill. However, Melrose Hill is located south of the Hollywood Freeway and outside the boundaries set by The East Hollywood Neighborhood Council.  (Melrose Hill is within the Hollywood Studio District Neighborhood Council.) Additionally, the Times does not mention Virgil Village, but the neighborhood is within the boundaries set by the Times.

Transportation

East Hollywood is served by the Metro B Line subway which runs north-south along Vermont Avenue and east-west along Hollywood Boulevard.

Metro subway stations include:
Vermont/Beverly
Vermont/Santa Monica
Vermont/Sunset
Hollywood/Western

Over a dozen bus lines run on the major thoroughfares, including Metro's Rapid and Local service lines. Los Angeles Department of Transportation's DASH shuttle lines, serving East Hollywood, Hollywood, and the Griffith Observatory, also operate in the area.

The 101/Hollywood Freeway cuts northwest from downtown Los Angeles, through Hollywood, to the San Fernando Valley.

Education

Thirteen percent of East Hollywood residents aged 25 and older had earned a four-year degree by 2000, an average figure for the city and the county, but the percentage of residents with less than a high school diploma was high for the county.

Schools within East Hollywood's borders are:

Public

 Lexington Avenue Primary Center, elementary, 4564 West Lexington Avenue
 Kingsley Elementary School, 5200 West Virginia Avenue
 Ramona Elementary School, 1133 North Mariposa Avenue
 Lockwood Avenue Elementary School, 4345 Lockwood Avenue
 Dayton Heights Elementary School, 607 North Westmoreland Avenue
 Alexandria Avenue Elementary School, 4211 Oakwood Avenue
 Harvard Elementary School, 330 North Harvard Boulevard

Private

 Alex Pilibos Armenian School, K-12, 1625 North Alexandria Avenue
 Progressive Student Learning Academy, 1518 North Alexandria Avenue
 Canyon Oaks School, 1414 North Catalina Street
 Immaculate Heart of Mary Elementary School, 1055 North Alexandria Avenue
 Blind Children's Center, Inc., 4120 Marathon Street

Notable places

 Barnsdall Art Park
 Hollyhock House
 Vista Theatre
 The Braille Institute
 The Cahuenga Branch of the Los Angeles Public Library; on the U.S. National Register of Historic Places
 Church of Scientology West Coast headquarters
 Los Angeles City College
 Self-Realization Fellowship
 Kaiser Permanente Los Angeles Medical Center
 Hollywood Presbyterian Medical Center
 Children's Hospital Los Angeles.
 Zankou Chicken's first American store

Notable people
 Charles Bukowski, writer
Leonardo DiCaprio, actor and film producer
Harry Northup, poet and actor

See also

 List of districts and neighborhoods of Los Angeles
 Hollywood, California
 West Hollywood, California
 North Hollywood, Los Angeles

References

External links

East Hollywood Neighborhood Council
 EastHollywood.net
 "This is East Hollywood", seven-minute video
  East Hollywood crime map and statistics

 
Neighborhoods in Los Angeles
Neighborhoods in Hollywood, Los Angeles
Central Los Angeles
Northwest Los Angeles
Armenian diaspora communities in the United States